Izso G. Glickstein (HU: Iczek Glückstein. Alternative names recorded: Isidore, Isaak, Yitzchok, Izso Garay, Izso Garai Glueckstein, Izso Gary) was a naturalized American cantor (hazzan). Glickstein was born on September 20, 1889 in Chișinău, Moldova and died on April 17, 1947 in Roxbury, Massachusetts. He was a fourth-generation, world-class chazzan and one of the "leading Jewish singers in America ranking with Cantor Josef "Yossele" Rosenblatt and others of equal prominence." He served as Chief Cantor at multiple synagogues including Europe's largest (the Great Synagogue of Budapest) and Leonard Bernstein's childhood synagogue in Roxbury, Massachusetts (Temple Mishkan Tefila). He hosted a weekly radio program on Boston's WORL and was heard often on WNAC to popularize Hebrew music.  Izso performed hundreds of concerts, was the President of the New England's Cantor's Association, and made multiple recordings of cantorial music.

Cantorial Lineage 
Izso (HU: Iczek Glückstein) was the oldest surviving son of Ezekiel Glickstein and Gizella Paskar (HU: Gitta Paszkar). Izso's cantorial lineage is summarized below.

Izso's grandfather Moshe Glickstein was a second-generation cantor born in Hannopil, Ukraine, where his father Haskel was the cantor in a town famous for its prominent role in the growth of the mystical Hasidism movement. Fleeing the growth of anti-semitism in central Ukraine around 1885, the family moved to Chișinău, Moldova which at this time was a thriving haven for Jews, thanks to the progressive programs of its mayor, Carol Schmidt from 1877 to 1903.  Moshe became Chief Cantor of the Great Synagogue of Kishinev and his son Ezekiel completed rabbinical school. It was during this phase of intense Jewish prosperity that Izso was born (1889).

Early life 
Izso's earliest memory of wanting to become a cantor was listening to his grandfather, Chief Cantor Moshe Glickstein, chant ancient prayers at the Great Synagogue of Kishinev. At the age of eight Izso was asked by his Grandfather to sing in his choir. Izso recalled this as one of the greatest events in his life, and was immediately hailed by the congregation as a prodigy or "wonder child." It was also during this time that Izso heard the famous cantor Zeidel Rowner (Jacob Samuel Maragowsky) sing when he visited The Great Synagogue of Kishinev. He then adopted the aspiration to become a great cantor. A year later, Izso's father Ezekiel graduated from rabbinical seminary and took a post in Zhytomyr. Ezekiel and Moshe vied for Izso's presence in their choirs. Izso preferred his grandfather's great synagogue over his father's smaller, remote synagogue. The dispute was resolved by Ezekiel paying Moshe to let Izso sing in Zhytomyr. The dispute over the nine-year-old Izso broadened. Other synagogues wanted Izso to sing for their choirs, but Ezekiel refused. One synagogue actually kidnapped Izso for the high holidays when he was still nine years old. The raiders came in the night and took him 20 kilometers away. Izso was returned after the festival with candy, toys, and 200 rubles (a small fortune at the time).  As the Jewish population in Chișinău grew to a large percent of the total population and dominated many aspects of commerce, resentment and anti-semitism grew. Sensing trouble, the family once again packed up and around 1896 moved to Rákoscsaba, Budapest, Hungary.

Education 
Izso and his four younger brothers studied Talmud and learned Hebrew melodies with their father Ezekiel from an early age.  After arriving to Rákoscsaba, Ezekiel was elected the high honor of Dayan or leader and advisor for the Jewish community. Izso entered public school and was advanced rapidly. At the ages of 15 through 18 (1904-1907) Izso was a member of the Orthodox Rumbach Street Synagogue and sang in the choir of the famous cantor Jacob Bachman. At the age of 19 (1908), Izso was sponsored by a wealthy Budapest woman to study voice in Nitra, Slovakia for a year, perhaps with Mordechai Krasnansky, a famous Nitra cantor at that time. The following year, at age 20 (1909), a wealthy merchant living in Rákoscsaba sponsored Izso's attendance at the Franz Liszt Academy of Music in Budapest. During his first year, Izso won an additional three-year scholarship from the school and completed four years of study (1909 to 1913). During his tenure at the Liszt Academy, Izso studied under Jenő Hubay as did Fritz Reiner and Joseph Szigeti, another prodigy.

Brief Opera Career 
Izso graduated from the Liszt Academy (1913) with an offer to join the Budapest Opera House (People's Opera of Budapest) for a year. This was a tremendous distinction for a 24-year-old graduate, and indicated that Izso had clearly established his reputation while at the Liszt Academy. Izso took the position and performed in many cities, including Budapest, Vienna and Berlin. He was acclaimed as a genius by the press and soon was given the position of lead tenor. Izso did not tell his father about his opera post, fearing Ezekiel's reaction. He maintained his Talmudic studies at the Budapest Yeshiva started by the famous Rabbi David Deutsch and sang with the Rumbach choir. When Ezekiel finally heard about Izso's success in the opera, he was furious. Ezekiel rejected Izso's pleading and threatened to disown him if Izso continued to reject his cantorial calling and legacy. Izso could not bear the risk of losing his family. So, despite the lure of a prominent secular life in the opera, Izso left the Budapest Opera House. Once he left the Opera, Izso resumed his cantorial ambitions.

World War I 
Not long after Izso left the opera, World War I erupted. After Archduke Franz Ferdinand of Austria was assassinated, Austria-Hungary declared war one month later and marched into Serbia. Izso was caught up in the quick mobilization and served as a chaplain in the Austro-Hungarian army. He was active for eight months, but was seriously wounded in the leg by an Italian artillery shell fragment during the First Battle of the Isonzo in 1915. He eventually recovered, but not in time to return to service.

Chief Cantor Positions

Celldömölk 
Izso's first cantorial post came in 1916 at Celldömölk (Czelldömölk, Zeldemark), Hungary at their Neolog synagogue where he also taught Yeshiva students. He and his wife Gisella Hochman left suddenly after the White Terror attack on August 23, 1919 during the Horthy regime. Soldiers broke into the synagogue, captured the rabbi, desecrated the synagogue, and robbed, raped, and murdered congregants

Dohány 
Back in Budapest, Izso succeeded Zevulun (Zavel) Kwartin to become Chief Cantor at the Dohány Street Synagogue, (The Great Synagogue, Tabak Temple), the center of Neolog Judaism and the largest synagogue in Europe seating 3,000 worshippers.

Győr 
Izso served as Chief Cantor at the GyőrSynagogue (Raab in German), a large, industrial town on the Austrian border between Budapest & Vienna and gave concerts in Vienna and other large European cities. He was so loved by the congregants that they continued to pay his family hoping Izso would return after taking a leave of absence in 1923 to visit America.

Mishkan Tefila 
Congregation Mishkan Tefila is the oldest Conservative synagogue in New England. Russian born Rabbi Herman H Rubenovitz joined the synagogue in 1910 committed to creating a superior music program to suit the more modern wealthy Jewish community evolving in the Boston area.  They created a mixed chorus and in 1922, Rabbi Rubenovitz scouted Europe's grandest synagogues to bring an authentic old-world chazzan to Boston's Temple Mishkan Tefila.  Cantor Glickstein was elected Chief Cantor in 1923. By 1925 they finished installing of an organ, the largest and finest of any Temple. In 1928 Izso was joined by Solomon Braslavsky, a prominent European musical director who composed arrangements to highlight Izso's golden tenor voice.

Family life 

Izso married Gizella Hochmann in 1916. They were most likely divorced before 1920.  There is no record of any children, but it is rumored they may have had a son Gabe. Gizella remarried in 1935.
Little by little Izso helped family members to settle in Boston. In June 1925, Izso married his first cousin Ida Denholtz (daughter of Joe Denholtz and Chava Paskar). Together they had three children – Helaine (Honey) 1926, Judith (Judy) 1927, and Mishel (Mitch) 1931. The Glickstein's were a very close family.  Izso's brothers Eugene, Louie and Adolph were also cantors and lived nearby.  His Sister Esther lived downstairs with their parents Ezekiel and Menya Gittel (Gisela) His relationship with his wife Ida was rocky. She was loving with the children and admiring of Izso, but often sickly and a poor housekeeper.  After both his parents passed, Izso moved into their room downstairs in Esther's home. Esther cooked many family dinners, helped care for the children, hosted the family Passover seders and kept a scrapbook of Izso and the other brother's accomplishments. In 1937 at the commemoration of their father Ezekial's tomb, the family formed the Glickstein Family Circle to promote the family ideals of unity, peace and harmony for generations to come.

Humanitarian Efforts 
Izso was widely known as a great humanitarian. He supported many organizations through benefit concerts, volunteer efforts and financial contributions. These include the Hebrew Aid Immigrant Services (HIAS) where he was chairman of the organization committee, Jewish Workers of Palestine, Jewish National Fund, World Zionist Organization and various schools, hospitals and relief funds for Eastern European Jewry.

Professional Associations 
Izso was very active in the Boston community.  His professional accomplishments include President of the New England Cantor's Association for several terms and honorary president at the time of his death, chaplain for the Masonic Germania Lodge and the Long Island Hospital. He also officiated for many weddings.

Influence on Leonard Bernstein 
Leonard was only eight years old when his family joined Mishkan Tefilah.  Leonard said of his early years in the synagogue "We had a fabulous cantor (Isadore Glickstein) who was a great musician and a beautiful man, very tall, very majestic.  He would begin to sing the ancient tunes - they are not exactly melodies, because they are not really written down; they're traditional, handed down orally - and he had a tenor voice of such sweetness and such richness - with a dark baritone quality - and then the organ would start and then the choir would begin with its colors, and I just began to get crazed with choral music."   Before young Lenny had his own piano, he practiced at Izso's house on Seaver Street. Izso was close friends with Leonard's father Sam (both from Russian Ukraine) and was Leonard's older brother Baron's godfather.

Radio Performances 
Later in 1923, Izso broadcast regularly on Sundays at Boston's WORL

Also heard many times on,WNAC, Boston April 18, May 24, 1927

Discography 
 Columbia Records, May 1925, 59972-1 Min Hametzar,  57011-F, 59973-2 R’zeih 57011-F
 VictorRecords, July 1925,  68710-A Barosh Hashonu (From the beginning of the year)  C 32940-2,  Taale (Y'aleh) C 32941-2
 Victor Records, July 1925, W 205588-1 Hashkivenb-Pt. i Co 57023-F(12'') W 205589-1 Hashkiveno-Pt. 2 Co 57023-F(12'')

References 

1889 births
1947 deaths
Musicians from Chișinău
People from Kishinyovsky Uyezd
Emigrants from the Russian Empire to Austria-Hungary
American people of Moldovan-Jewish descent
People from Roxbury, Boston
Hazzans
20th-century Moldovan male singers
Austro-Hungarian military personnel of World War I